Ian Anthony Dale (born July 3, 1978) is an American actor. His notable roles include Adam Noshimuri on Hawaii Five-0, Harris Edwards on Salvation, Simon Lee on The Event, Davis Lee on Surface, Avatar Gamma on Charmed and Kazuya Mishima in Tekken. He has also appeared on shows such as Las Vegas, JAG, Day Break, CSI: Crime Scene Investigation, Criminal Minds, 24 and The Walking Dead.

Early life
Born in Saint Paul, Minnesota, Dale attended Cretin-Derham Hall High School where he was a standout baseball player and also first discovered acting. His father Jack Dale, who is of English and French descent, played ice hockey for the Minnesota Golden Gophers and made the national team for the 1968 Winter Olympics. His mother is Japanese and immigrated from Kobe to the United States as a teenager.

Dale attended St. Mary's University in Winona, Minnesota where he studied stage and theatre and then moved to Madison, Wisconsin, graduating from the University of Wisconsin–Madison. During his first several years in Los Angeles, he worked as a carpenter building sets to make ends meet while taking acting classes and auditioning for roles.

Career

Film
In 2004, Dale appeared in the film Mr. 3000 as "Fukuda", alongside Bernie Mac, Angela Bassett and Chris Noth. His next movie role was in 2007's The Bucket List as an instructor to Jack Nicholson and Morgan Freeman's characters in one of the scenes. In 2009, he followed that up with a minor part in The Hangover, appeared in the independent film Lollipops and starred in Tekken as Kazuya Mishima. In 2010, he appeared in the film Flying Lessons. In 2010, he also portrayed Scorpion in the short film of Mortal Kombat: Rebirth on YouTube. The film paved way for a web series, Mortal Kombat: Legacy, in which Dale reprised his role. He reprised his role in the second season.

Television
Dale had his first television break on a 2002 episode of Fastlane. Since then he has appeared in episodes of Angel, JAG, Las Vegas, Charmed, 24, CSI: Crime Scene Investigation, Criminal Minds, Dollhouse and Cold Case.

Major television roles have included recurring character Davis Lee on Surface and Detective Christopher Choi on Day Break. Both series were only broadcast for one season and did not return for a second. Dale was a series regular in the NBC drama series The Event, which ran in the fall of 2010.

Hawaii Five-0, Murder in the First and Salvation
Beginning in 2011 with the second season Dale portrayed the recurring role of Adam Noshimuri in the 2010 remake of Hawaii Five-O. The character was first introduced as the head of the Yakuza, later becoming a police officer; and current boyfriend, later husband, of Kono Kalakaua, who was portrayed by series regular Grace Park. Following Park's departure from the series, Dale was promoted to the main cast beginning with the eighth season, a role which he held until the series concluded with its tenth season in 2020. Dale also directed an episode of the series during its final season, and later crossed over to the 2018 reboot of Magnum, P.I. during its second season.

During his time on Hawaii Five-0 Dale was also cast in series regular roles on Murder in the First as Jim Koto and in Salvation, to portray Harris Edwards. Both roles were held for the entirety of both series run; three seasons from 2014–2016 and two seasons from 2017–2018, respectively. Other roles during this time included guest stints on The Mentalist and American Horror Story: Coven, two-episode story arcs on Emily Owens, M.D. and Hart of Dixie, and the unsold television adaptation of Delirium.

Post Hawaii Five-0
Following Hawaii Five-0 Dale had a brief recurring role as Louis Bravo on the American legal drama All Rise, and was cast to portray Tomi, Yumiko's long lost brother in the eleventh and final season of The Walking Dead. In November 2022 Dale was cast to play Dr. James Yamada on The Resident.

Acting credits

Film

Television

Web

Video games

Directing credits

References

External links
 
 

1978 births
21st-century American male actors
American male actors of Japanese descent
American male film actors
American male television actors
American male video game actors
American male voice actors
American film actors of Asian descent
American people of English descent
American people of French descent
Living people
Male actors from Saint Paul, Minnesota
Saint Mary's University of Minnesota alumni
University of Wisconsin–Madison alumni